The Akanyaru Multipurpose Dam, is a planned dam across the Akanyaru River, at the international border between Rwanda and Burundi. The water is expected to supply drinking water to an estimated 614,200 people in both countries. The reservoir is also expected to provide irrigation water to an estimated  of agricultural land in Burundi and Rwanda, benefitting an estimated 24,948 farmers.

Location
The power station would be on the Akanyaru River, along Rwanda's border with Burundi, in present-day Gisagara District in Southern Province, Rwanda and in Commune of Ntega in Kirundo Province, Burundi.

History
In 2012, the two East African countries and the Nile Equatorial Lakes Subsidiary Action Program (NELSAP), identified the Akanyaru Multipurpose Water Resources Development Project. That year, NELSAP carried out pre-feasibility studies.

In 2015, the Nile Council of Ministers approved the Akanyaru Project. Delegations from Rwanda and Burundi appraised the project site in May 2016. In March 2018, NELSAP prepared a full funding proposal to the African Development Bank (AfDB). In 2020, tenders were floated for full  Environmental and social impact assessment (ESIA) studies, Resettlement Action Plan (RAP), full feasibility studies, detailed design and preparation of tender documents for the project were initiated. Project studies are expected to conclude in March 2022.

Funding
In February 2021, the project cost was calculated at US$190 million. Loan application was made to the AfDB, under its NEPAD Infrastructure Project Preparation Facility (NEPAD-IPPF).

Other considerations
The proposed  Akanyaru Hydroelectric Power Station, is expected to supply electricity to 141,111 homes in both countries, serving an estimated 846,000 people. The project also involves the restoration of degraded watersheds upstream of the Akanyaru Dam.

See also

 List of power stations in Rwanda
 List of power stations in Burundi
 Pwalugu Multipurpose Dam

References

External links
 Funds mobilization ongoing for Akanyaru Multipurpose Water Resources Development Project As of 24 February 2021.

Hydroelectric power stations in Rwanda
Hydroelectric power stations in Burundi
Dams in Rwanda
Dams in Burundi
Southern Province, Rwanda
Gisagara District
Kirundo Province
Burundi–Rwanda relations